Aldrick Robinson (born September 24, 1988) is a former American football wide receiver and coach who is an offensive assistant for the Miami Dolphins of the National Football League (NFL). He played college football at Southern Methodist University (SMU) and was drafted in the sixth round of the 2011 NFL Draft by the Washington Redskins. He has played for the Baltimore Ravens, Atlanta Falcons, San Francisco 49ers, Minnesota Vikings, and Carolina Panthers.

Early life
Robinson attended Waxahachie High School in Waxahachie, Texas, where he played football for the Indians. As a junior, he recorded 21 receptions for 651 yards and eight touchdowns. As a senior, he recorded 29 receptions for 647 yards and eight touchdowns and over 1,500 all-purpose yards. He was also named the team's most valuable player, a PrepStar all-region and a two-time all-district player. He was ranked 96th on The Dallas Morning News Area Top 100 list and named a Dave Campbell's Texas Football Player to Watch.

Robinson was ranked a two-star prospect by Scout.com and Rivals.com. Robinson received a scholarship offer from Kansas, but turned it down in order to attend SMU.

College career
Robinson enrolled at Southern Methodist University as a management science pre-major. As a true freshman in 2007, he saw action in nine games and recorded ten receptions for 166 yards. Against Rice, he returned three kicks for 80 yards. He recorded his season-high of three passes against Tulsa and season-long 48-yard receptions against the Houston Cougars.

In 2008, Robinson started in ten games and recorded 59 receptions for 1,047 yards and 11 touchdowns. He tied the SMU single-season touchdown record and became the third Mustang to compile a 1,000-yard season. His 210 yards against UCF was the all-time second-highest for a game at SMU and caught the school's second-longest touchdown reception at 94 yards. Robinson was named an honorable mention All-Conference USA player and to the Pegasus News All-DFW College Football Team.

SMU head coach June Jones called him the fastest player he has coached and projected him as a first-day NFL Draft selection. In spring 2009, College Football News included him among their "120 Players to Know". NationalChamps.net named him to their 2009 Underdog Award watchlist.

Robinson also competed in prep track and field. He finished second in the 200-meter dash at the University Interscholastic League (UIL) 4A State Championship with a time of 21.48 seconds, and placed 6th in the 100-meter dash at the Texas Relays with a time of 10.61 seconds.

Collegiate statistics

Professional career

Washington Redskins

2011 season
Robinson was selected by the Washington Redskins in the sixth round of the 2011 NFL Draft. On September 3, he was waived, but placed on the practice squad on September 6. Robinson was activated to the active roster on December 27, filling the spot left open after Ryan Torain was waived.

2012 season

At the start of 2012 training camp, it was announced that Robinson was taking reps as a punt returner, providing competition for Brandon Banks. After having an impressive performance in the preseason, he made the final 53-man roster at the start of the 2012 season. Robinson made his NFL debut in the 2012 season opener win against the New Orleans Saints, subbing in for Pierre Garçon, who missed the entire second half of the game after suffering a foot injury. In the game, he recorded 52 yards on four receptions and scored his first career touchdown. In Week 2 against the St. Louis Rams, Robinson had his first career start in place of an injured Garçon. Though he recorded 40 yards on two receptions, he dropped a crucial 57-yard pass that hit him in the chest in the fourth quarter in their 31-28 loss to the Rams. During pre-game warm-ups for the Week 4 game against the Tampa Bay Buccaneers, Brandon Meriweather collided with him and both were inactive for the game, due to Meriweather re-injuring his knee and Robinson out with a concussion. In the Week 11 win against the Philadelphia Eagles, Robinson scored his second career touchdown after catching a 49-yard touchdown pass from Robert Griffin III. The following week, he caught a 68-yard touchdown pass in the Redskins' victory over the Dallas Cowboys on Thanksgiving.

2013 season
After having a quiet start to the 2013 season, Robinson caught two passes for 75 yards, which included a 45-yard touchdown reception from Robert Griffin III in the 45-41 Week 7 win against the Chicago Bears. In Week 11, he scored a 41-yard touchdown pass against the Philadelphia Eagles.

2014 season
On February 6, 2014, Robinson re-signed with the Redskins on a one-year deal. On April 2, 2014, Robinson announced that he would be switching over to #15, allowing new teammate DeSean Jackson to wear number 11. He was waived by the team on December 6.

Baltimore Ravens
Robinson signed with the Baltimore Ravens practice squad on December 9, 2014.

On January 23, 2015, Robinson signed a futures contract with the Ravens. He was released by the Ravens on August 29, 2015.

Atlanta Falcons

2016 season
Robinson signed with the Atlanta Falcons on March 15, 2016. In Week 4 against the Panthers, Robinson recorded two catches for 48 yards and his first touchdown since the 2013 season. Robinson and the Falcons reached Super Bowl LI, where they faced the New England Patriots. In the Super Bowl, the Falcons fell 34–28 in overtime. Robinson finished the 2016 season with 20 receptions for 323 yards and two touchdowns on 32 targets. His 61.3% catch rate was the best percentage of his career.

San Francisco 49ers
On March 10, 2017, Robinson signed a two-year contract with the San Francisco 49ers.

On September 10, 2017, in his 49ers debut, Robinson had one reception for seven yards in the season opening 23–3 loss to the Carolina Panthers.

On August 31, 2018, Robinson was released by the 49ers.

Minnesota Vikings
On September 17, 2018, Robinson signed with the Minnesota Vikings. In Week 4 of the 2018 season, against the Los Angeles Rams, he recorded two receiving touchdowns from Kirk Cousins in the 38–31 loss.

Robinson finished the 2018 season with 17 receptions for 231 yards and 5 touchdowns.

Carolina Panthers
On May 17, 2019, Robinson signed with the Carolina Panthers. He was released during final roster cuts on August 30, 2019.

Coaching career

Miami Dolphins
In February 2022, Robinson became an offensive assistant on Head Coach Mike McDaniel’s inaugural staff with the Miami Dolphins.

References

External links
 Official website
 Atlanta Falcons bio
 Southern Methodist University bio

1988 births
Living people
Atlanta Falcons players
Baltimore Ravens players
Carolina Panthers players
Minnesota Vikings players
People from Waxahachie, Texas
Players of American football from Texas
San Francisco 49ers players
SMU Mustangs football players
Sportspeople from the Dallas–Fort Worth metroplex
Washington Redskins players
Waxahachie High School alumni
Miami Dolphins coaches